The 1998 SCCA Pro Racing World Challenge was the ninth running of the Sports Car Club of America's World Challenge series. It was the final year before SpeedVision purchased the series, thus giving the World Challenge a TV contract. This led to the series' popularity growing and ultimately surpassing that of the Trans Am Series. 1998 was the final year of the T1/T2 format, as Speed reformatted the classes into GT and TC.

Results

References

GT World Challenge America